Bağcılar Olympic Sport Hall is a multi-purpose indoor sports complex with Olympic standards located in Bağcılar district of Istanbul, Turkey.

Its construction began in 1998 and the sport hall was inaugurated on March 20, 2001 in presence of the Belgian action films actor and former martial arts sportsman Jean-Claude Van Damme. The sports complex is owned by the Metropolitan Municipality of Istanbul. The main hall of the building is suitable for sports events such as basketball, volleyball, badminton, wrestling, handball, tennis, gymnastics, weightlifting, boxing, martial arts, fencing, table tennis and indoor soccer. It offers a seating capacity for 1,300 people. Additionally, there are also 8 halls for fencing, judo, taekwondo, karate, table tennis (2 halls), aerobics, gymnastics, weightlifting, boxing and wrestling. Its covered parking lot has a capacity of 800 cars.

International sport events hosted
 July 25–30, 2006 European U17 Freestyle, Greco-Roman and Women's Wrestling Championships
 October 19–21, 2007 5th World Junior and Cadet Karate Championships
 October 22–25, 2007 European Junior Badminton Ranking Championship
 October 24–28, 2007 European U17 Badminton Team Championships
 September 8–11, 2011 The 1st and Greatest Asian Martial Arts Olympiad Competitions

Architecture
The six-storey building is covered by a double-curved roof having the shape of a hyperbolic paraboloid made in space frame system. The appearance of the building is a rectangular form in natural stone with a dome designed as two merging thin-shell structures rising up through it.

References

External links
Istanbul Metropolitan Municipality

Sports venues in Istanbul
Indoor arenas in Turkey
Sports venues completed in 2001
Basketball venues in Turkey
Handball venues in Turkey
Bağcılar
2001 establishments in Turkey